Rashfield; is a hamlet on the Cowal peninsula, situated between Loch Eck and the head of Holy Loch, in Argyll and Bute, West of Scotland. The hamlet is on the A815 road and the River Eachaig flows pass from Loch Eck to the Holy Loch. Rashfield is within the Argyll Forest Park which is itself within the Loch Lomond and The Trossachs National Park.

Rashfield Primary School
Rashfield Primary School was closed in 1997. Pupils now travel either to Sandbank Primary or Strone Primary.

References

External links

 Argyll Forest Park - website
 Loch Lomond and The Trossachs National Park - website

Villages in Cowal